The Brontë Way is a waymarked long-distance footpath in the northern counties of West Yorkshire and Lancashire, England.

Route

The Brontë Way starts at Oakwell Hall in Birstall, West Yorkshire, and finishes at Gawthorpe Hall in Padiham, Lancashire. At a steady pace, it may typically take four days to walk.

The route has been designed to link places that have strong associations with the writings of the Brontë family, incorporating places that feature in their work, such as Oakwell Hall, Charlotte Brontë's inspiration for Fieldhead in her 1849 novel, Shirley, and Top Withens, Emily Brontë's possible inspiration for the home in her 1847 novel Wuthering Heights. The route passes through Thornton, where the Brontë children were born, and Haworth and Haworth Parsonage, where the family lived. It passes through  Penistone Hill Country Park, open moorland, and areas of industrial heritage interest; public transport links to the route and its four main sections. Two guidebooks are available.

Further reading

References

External links

Brontë Country website info on the Brontë Way
Walking Pages website info on the walk route

Long-distance footpaths in England
Footpaths in West Yorkshire
Footpaths in Lancashire
Brontë family